Tyler Odom was the lead guitarist of the Alabama-based emo band Northstar.  After the band's dissolution, Odom and another former bandmate, Nick Torres, formed Cassino. He also records in indie rock band Destry and The Wallace Virgil.

References

Living people
Year of birth missing (living people)
Guitarists from Alabama
Place of birth missing (living people)